Khovansky (masculine), Khovanskaya (feminine), or Khovanskoye (neuter) is the name of several rural localities in Russia:
Khovansky (rural locality), a khutor in Buyerak-Popovsky Selsoviet of Serafimovichsky District of Volgograd Oblast
Khovanskoye, Moscow Oblast, a village under the administrative jurisdiction of the suburban settlement of Snegiri, Istrinsky District, Moscow Oblast
Khovanskoye, Tula Oblast, a village in Plastovsky Rural Okrug of Aleksinsky District of Tula Oblast
Khovanskoye Cemetery, a large cemetery in Sosenskoye rural settlement of Novomoskovsky Administrative Okrug of Moscow